Adv. V. K. Prasanth, popularly known as 'Mayor Bro', is an Indian politician belonging to the Communist Party of India (Marxist). He was born and raised at Kazhakootam, Thiruvananthapuram. In 2015, aged 34, he was elected to the Kazhakoottam ward of the city, with a margin of 3,272 votes, the highest majority secured by a candidate in the corporation's history. He went on to become the 44th mayor of Thiruvananthapuram, the largest corporation and capital of Kerala.

2019 Kerala legislative assembly by-election 
The Left Democratic Front fielded V. K. Prasanth in Vattiyoorkavu constituency for the 2019 Kerala legislative assembly by-election necessitated after sitting MLA K. Muraleedharan was elected to the Lok Sabha in the 2019 Indian general election.

2021 Kerala legislative assembly election 

V. K. Prasanth was reelected to Kerala Legislative Assembly from Vattiyoorkavu by vote margin of 21,515.

V. K. Prasanth
|
|
|61,111 - VOTES
|41.44
|V. V. Rajesh
|
|
|39,596 - VOTES
|28.77

References

Living people
Communist Party of India (Marxist) politicians from Kerala
Kerala MLAs 2016–2021
1981 births